Henry Renouf (1820 – March 18, 1880) was an educator, judge and political figure in Newfoundland. He represented St. John's West from 1861 to 1869 and Placentia and St. Mary's from 1869 to 1873 in the Newfoundland and Labrador House of Assembly.

He was born in St. John's, the son of John Renouf and Johanna Little. He worked in the family business for a time, later opening a private academy in St. John's. In the 1869 general election, running as an Anti-Confederate, Renouf was elected in both St. John's and Placentia and St. Mary's, later choosing to sit for the latter district. He served in the Executive Council as surveyor general and chairman of the Board of Works. In 1873, he resigned his seat in the assembly after he was named a judge in the Central District court. Renouf also served as major in the St. John's Volunteer Rifles.

References 
 

Members of the Newfoundland and Labrador House of Assembly
1820 births
1889 deaths
Members of the Executive Council of Newfoundland and Labrador
Newfoundland Colony judges